The Mauritius national badminton team represents Mauritius in international badminton team competitions. It is controlled by the Mauritius Badminton Association. Mauritius have won two times in the African Badminton Championships women's team event, won once in the mixed team event but only finished as runner-ups and semifinalists in the men's team.

The Mauritian team have never participated in the Thomas Cup.

Participation in BWF competitions

Uber Cup

Sudirman Cup

Participation in African Badminton Championships

Men's team

Women's team

Mixed team

Players 

Male players
Georges Paul
Christopher Paul
Jean Bernard Bongout
Tejraj Pultoo
Khabir Teeluck
Aatish Lubah
Melvin Appiah

Female players
Kate Foo Kune
Karen Foo Kune
Kobita Dookhee
Ganesha Mungrah
Vilina Appiah
Aurélie Allet
Lorna Bodha
Shaama Sandooyea
Jemimah Leung

References

Badminton
National badminton teams
Badminton in Mauritius